Han Jung-soo (born November 20, 1973) is a South Korean actor. He is best known for his roles in the television series The Slave Hunters and Prosecutor Princess.

Filmography

Television series

Film

Television show

Theater

References

External links

Han Jung-soo at Cyworld
Han Jeong-su at Namoo Actors

South Korean male television actors
South Korean male film actors
South Korean male stage actors
1973 births
Living people
Seoul Institute of the Arts alumni
Gachon University alumni